Cobh GAA is a Gaelic Athletic Association club based in the town of Cobh, in County Cork, Ireland. The club fields both Hurling and Gaelic football teams.  The club is a member of Cork GAA and Imokilly divisional board. The club's hurling team currently play in the Junior A grade and the footballers play Junior B grade.

Achievements
 Cork Senior Football Championship Winners (2) 1918, 1919;  Runners-Up 1910, 1920
 Cork Intermediate Hurling Championship Winners (3) 1916, 1927, 1963;  Runners-Up 1962, 1966, 1967, 1969
 Cork Intermediate Football Championship Winners (3) 1909, 1916, 1968
 Cork Junior Hurling Championship Winners (5) 1907, 1913, 1916, 1926, 1959;  Runners-Up 1911, 1912, 1923, 1985
 Cork Junior Football Championship Winners (3) 1901, 1908, 1954
 Cork Junior B Inter-Divisional Football Championship Winners 2017
 Cork Minor Hurling Championship Winners (1) 1917;   Runners-Up 1916, 1980
 Cork Minor C Hurling Championship Winners (1) 2015
 Cork Minor Football Championship Winners (1) 1919;   Runners-Up 1943, 1944
 Cork Minor A Football Championship Winners (1) 1994
 Cork Minor C Hurling Championship Winners (1) 2009
 East Cork Junior A Hurling Championship Winners (3) 1926, 1959, 1985;  | Runners-Up 1952, 1958, 2014
 East Cork Junior A Football Championship Winners (9) 1927, 1944, 1947, 1953, 1954, 1955, 1956, 1960, 1988;   | Runners-Up 1928, 1940, 1958, 1986, 1998, 2005
 East Cork Junior C Hurling Championship Winners (2) 2017, 2019

Notable players
 Derek Barrett
 Mick Daly

References

External sources
Cobh GAA website

Gaelic games clubs in County Cork
Gaelic football clubs in County Cork
Hurling clubs in County Cork
Cobh